Mohamed Mahmoud Sobhy (born March 3, 1948) is an Egyptian film, television and stage actor and director, known for several Egyptian movies.

Early life and education
Mohamed Mahmoud Sobhi was born in Cairo. He graduated from the Institute of Drama in 1970 and continued to teach until 1984.

Awards
 Doctor Soaad ElS abbah for intellectual creativity (1991)
 Honorary Certificate in the Arabic theatre ceremony (1994)
 Best Egyptian Actor (1996,1998)
 Best Egyptian Theatre Actor (1998)
 The Best Actor Golden Lion award (1999-2001)
 The Best Director Golden Lion Award (1999-2001)
 Middle East Best Director (2001)
 Honorary PhD degree from the American University of California (2013)
 Honorary master's degree from the British University of Cambridge (2013)

Filmography

Plays 

 Hello Shalaby
 Comparse El-Mosem (The extra of the season)
 Al-Tha3lab (The Fox)
 Entaha El-Dars Ya Ghabi (The Lesson is Over, Stupid)
 Hamlet 
 Ali-Beih Mazhar (Mr. Ali Mazhar)
 Enta Horr (You are free)
 El-Mahzooz (The unstable)
 El-Joker (The Joker)
 El-Hamagy (The Barbarian)
 Takhareef (Superstitions)
 El-Baghbaghan (The Parrot)
 Weg'het Nazar (A Point of View)
 Bel-Araby El-Fasi7 (In Plain Arabic)
 Tabeeb Raghm Anfoh (Doctor Despite His Will)
 Mama America (Mother America)
 A'alat Wanees (The Wanees Family)
 Le'bet El-Set (A Woman's Plaything)
 Sekket El-Salama 2000 (The Road to Safety 2000)
 Carmen/ With a Different Perspective Of Mohammed Sobhy
 Amir Rafik
 Ghazal Al-Banat (Girls Flirting)
 Khebitna (Our Discomfiture)
 nagoum el zohr ( stars in the middle of the day)

Selected films 

 Al Gareeh (The Injured) 
 Ali Beih Mazhar (Mr. Ali Mazhar)
 Uncle Zizou Habibi (1977) (My Beloved Uncle Zizou)
 Houna Al-Qahira (Here is Cairo)
 Al Karnak (The Karnak) 
 Al-Ameel Rakam 13 (Agent 13)
 Al-Shyatana Alty Ahabatny (The Devil Who Loved Me)
 El Moshagheb 6 (The 6th trouble-maker)
 Batal Mn Al Sa'eed (A Champion from The South)
 Elfloos wel Wohoosh (The Money and The Monsters)
  (A Trainee Lawyer)
 Ela'abqary Khamsa (The Genius Number Five)

TV series

 Ali Beih Mazhar (Mr. Aly Mazhar)
 Rehlet el Melyoon (The Million Journey)
 Sonbol ba3d el Melyoon (Sumbul After the Million)
 Yomyat Wanees (Wanees's Diaries) 
 Faris bila Gawad (Cavalier Without A Steed)
 Mal7 el Ard (Salt of the Earth)
 'Ayesh Fe Al Ghaibooba (Living In A Coma)
 Ana wa Ha'ola' (Me And Those)
 Ragol Ghany Faqeer Giddan (A Very Poor Rich Man)
 Al Nems
 Alam Ghareeb Gedan
 Shamlool 
 Kimo

Controversy
In an interview which aired on the Egyptian Dream 2 TV on March 8, 2014 (as translated by Israeli founded MEMRI), Sobhi stated that "Benjamin Franklin delivered a speech [in 1787], which became very well known. I myself used it in “Horseman without a Horse.” [The Americans] saw that a catastrophe was imminent, due to the Satanic ideas of that terrorist group. That was when Franklin delivered his speech to the American people. He said: “I warn you that if these terrorist groups of Jews flock to America, they will control American decision-making within a hundred years. They will control America itself, and will trample us underfoot." Sobhi also argued "You’ll see when you read the Protocols of the Elders of Zion."

References

External links 
 
 elcinema.com 
 Mohamed Sobhy Facebook Official Page

Egyptian male film actors
Egyptian comedians
Living people
1948 births
Egyptian male stage actors
Egyptian male television actors
Male actors from Cairo